In the United States and various other countries, spackling paste or spackle is a putty used to fill holes, small cracks, and other minor surface defects in wood, drywall, and plaster.   Typically, spackling is composed of gypsum plaster from hydrated calcium sulfate and glue.

Comparison with joint compound

Spackling paste is comparable and contrastable with joint compound. They look similar and serve the similar purpose of filling in low spots in walls and ceilings. The chief differences are that spackling paste dries faster, shrinks less during drying, and is meant for smaller repairs, whereas joint compound (called drywall mud by many builders and contractors) dries slower, shrinks more during drying, and is meant for filling the seams among multiple sheets of drywall across a large installation, such as a whole room or a whole house. It is not uncommon for the general public to call any of these products "spackle" in a vague way, but tradespersons usually specify joint compound (drywall mud) when that is specifically what they mean.

Trademark
Spackle is a registered trademark of the Muralo Company, located in Bayonne, New Jersey. Muralo's product is dry powder, to be mixed with water by the user to form putty or paste. It was brought to market in 1927, then patented and trademarked in 1928. The term spackle has since become a genericized trademark applied in the United States to a variety of household hole-filling products. (Such products may also be referred to as "spackling" compounds.)

The first written appearance of the generic use of the word spackle was around 1940. The product name was likely derived from the German word , meaning "putty knife" or "filler." Other possible origins include Russian  (tr. ; to fill holes with putty or caulk), Polish  (spatula or putty knife), and Yiddish  (to fill in small holes in plaster), all of which are likely derived from German.

Polyfilla
In the UK, Ireland, South Africa, Australia, and Canada, the brand "Polyfilla", multi-purpose filler, is used as a generic term for spackling paste, even though it differs from spackle in being cellulose based. The manufacturers claim that it has an advantage over spackle in that it does not shrink or crack.

See also
 Caulking
 Putty
 Home repair
 Joint compound
 Plastering

References

External links
Official Website

Home improvement
Building materials
Plastering